Missé is a former commune in the Deux-Sèvres department in western France. On 1 January 2019, it was merged into the commune Thouars.

It is situated on the river Thouet some 5 km upstream from the town of Thouars, and is the site of a spectacular loop in the river.

See also
Communes of the Deux-Sèvres department

References

Former communes of Deux-Sèvres